Bantay, officially the Municipality of Bantay, is a 3rd class municipality in the province of Ilocos Sur, Philippines. According to the 2020 census, it has a population of 37,118 people. It is situated just north-east of Vigan, the provincial capital.

History

Creation of the municipality
Spanish conquistador Juan de Salcedo first arrived in Ilocos in 1571 and began setting up tribunals that soon became the seat of municipal governance. Augustinian friars followed in 1572 built the convent and house of worship that later became Iglesia Parroquial de San Agustín (St. Augustine Parish Church). But it was only in 1591 that the parish was recognized or first established, while the town of Bantay was formally founded as a pueblo in 1593 because it was formerly part of Vigan. It is one of the thirty-four (34) towns of the Province of Ilocos Sur, the legal basis of its creation is the Maura Law of 1893 and, thus, was constituted as a separate political subdivision during the American Regime.

Early history
The early Spanish settlers made the town beautiful by building the 'tribunal', otherwise known as the town hall, the church, bell tower, roads and streets by forced labor. The St. Augustine Church was originally made of bamboo and cogon structure by Bantay residents to house the miraculous Image of Our Lady of Charity, but it was later-on changed into a permanent edifice (built and completed in 1590) because of the good fortune it brought to the people. The Augustinian friars chose St. Augustine de Hippo, the Doctor of Grace, as the Patron Saint and the town fiesta used to be celebrated every 28 August, but because of inclement weather during this month, Most Rev. Alfredo Verzosa (Parish Priest, 1912–1916) caused the transfer of the festivity to May 5 every year.

The original inhabitants of the town have family names with letter "P" taken from the designated listing, as an adopted system of the Spanish rulers in all towns of Ilocos Sur, to easily identify and monitor movement of residents. In a report of Most Reverend Bishop Domingo de Soria on August 15, 1613, the population of Bantay was 4,000 souls while at that time, Vigan has only 2,000. This can be explained by the fact that by then, Bantay parish was very extensive and broad the inclusions of the parishes of Magsingal (separated in 1676), Santo Domingo (separated in 1742), San Ildefonso (separated in 1769), San Vicente(Separated in 1795), Santa Catalina de Baba (separated in 1795) and Santa Catalina de Alexandria within its coverage or "visitas".

One of the Augustinian friars, Rev. Francisco Lopez, a great Augustinian philologist, with the help of Pedro Bukaneg, the blind genius of the Ilocano tongue who was from this place and author of the epic - "Biag Ni Lam-ang", labored hard to translate the Bellarmine Cathechism originally written by Robert Cardinal Bellarmine. The book was approved at the Bantay Convent in 1616 printed in Malayan Script and Spanish alphabet and was first published in 1621. The Bellarmine Catechism was the first book in Ilocano to be printed and its influence on the morality, culture and language of the entire Ilocos is measurable.

Several battles have spillovers in Bantay, one of which was the Ilocos Revolution (Dec. 24, 1762 to May 1763) led by Diego Silang. Here, this heroic figure resolved to kill the bishop-elect Bernardo Ustariz and all Spanish friars imprisoned by him in Bantay. The prisoners prayed fervently to Our Lady of Charity for their deliverance until a Spanish mestizo nicknamed "Miguel Vicos" treacherously killed Silang on May 28, 1763, with a pistol at his makeshift fort on a place on a hillside referred to as Calle Encuentro (now Crisologo Street). For the Spaniards, the treacherous Vicos was their savior and to his honor a commemorative monument was erected in 1763 which became the epitome of the Town Plaza. It is replaced later by a memorial to Diego Silang towards the end of the 19th century.

Contemporary History
Inspired with the common vision that it will strengthen and improve the totality of local governance, Municipal buildings [Annex I (Legislative Building) and Annex II (Puericulture Building)] were blessed and inaugurated on December 23, 1999, and May 5, 2003, respectively. Considered as major breakthroughs and milestone feats in the History of Bantay, these massive structures were built to 'reinforce' the Old(Main) Building in order to meet the vast administrative demands and service requirements of the public clientele. Sourced from Provincial and Municipal funds, these expansion edifices are the lasting tributes of the municipal andministrators (1998-2001 and 2001–2004) showcasing local accomplishment and a legacy during their incumbency.

Dur-as Bantay Era
The Municipality holds the distinction of being the first Local Government Unit in Ilocos Sur to use an Electronic Scoreboard in a sporting event (the first ever to do so in the province was the University of Northern Philippines); the first to open hiking trails; and the first municipality in Ilocos Sur to hold a National Shootfest.

Geography

It is surrounded by Vigan City and the municipalities of Caoayan, San Vicente, Santa Catalina, Santo Domingo, and Magsingal, Ilocos Sur; and San Quintin and Langiden in the neighboring province of Abra. It is an elevated and hilly municipality but some barangays, especially those near creeks, are prone to flooding during heavy typhoons.

Barangays
Bantay is politically subdivided into 34 barangays. These barangays are headed by elected officials: Barangay Captain, Barangay Council, whose members are called Barangay Councilors. All are elected every three years.

Climate

Flora and Fauna
Bantay's reserved forests and farms make it home to a diverse range of plants, animals, and river creatures.  Around more than 60 species can be found in Bantay including over 9 mammal, reptile (including monitor lizards), and amphibian species; 10 bird and fish species; several insects and plants are existing in the farms and wild.

Typical of places all over the Philippines, cattle and water buffalo are domesticated. Herons are often sighted in rice paddies, and beetles (especially the "aros-aros" and the "abal-abal") and crickets come seasonally. Mudfish, carp, the Abra River eel, and other fish abound in its rivers and creeks, most of which are also seasonal.  Monkeys, wild boar, and wild chickens can be seen in the mountains, but not as plentiful as before.

Spanish plum trees (known locally as "sarguelas") abound in the municipality, especially in Barangays Paing and Banaoang.  Valuable lumber trees such as mahogany and molave abound in its mountains, especially in Caniao. Bamboo also abound in the municipality, especially the "bayug," "bikal," and "bulo" ("buho") varieties.

Demographics

In the 2020 census, Bantay had a population of 37,118.

Religion

About 94% of the total inhabitants are Christians, while the remaining 6% are Muslims or belong to other major religions/sects.

In the total population of Christian Bantayenos, Roman Catholics are 99%. Since it was occupied by Spaniards during the Early Colonial Period.

Language
Since the Ilocano language is the mother tongue of the Ilocanos, most of the Bantayeños especially the Muslims and Indians speak it alongside Tagalog. However, in schools and during Legislative Sessions (by the Sangguniang Bayan), they are required to speak English.

 Ilocano - 97%
 Tagalog - 2%
 English - 1%

Economy

Government
Bantay, belonging to the first congressional district of the province of Ilocos Sur, is governed by a mayor designated as its local chief executive and by a municipal council as its legislative body in accordance with the Local Government Code. The mayor, vice mayor, and the councilors are elected directly by the people through an election which is being held every three years.

For the 2010–2013 term, Samuel C. Parilla was the elected mayor of the town (since 1988–1998; 2007–present), with Floro Jose P. Peredo, Sr. as the vice mayor.  The municipality's Sangguniang Bayan members included William Pre, Roberto Reboroso, William Pacpaco, Ireneo Quintinita, Edilberto Mercurio, Nick Pamuspusan, Arnold Paz, and George Leones.  Also in the Sangguniang Bayan were ABC President Gloria Ramirez and Sangguniang Kabataan Federated President Jonalyn Pre.

Elected officials

Tourism

Cultural and historical 
Saint Augustine Parish Church One of two parishes in the municipality.  It serves as the Sanctuary of Nuestra Señora de La Caridad, the Queen of Ilocandia. The church and bell tower are considered to be the two of the oldest structures in the province, as the bell tower was built in 1590 and the church was in the following year. The place, especially the bell tower, is a tourist attraction mostly accessed from Vigan by means of horse-drawn carts called "calesas." The original beauty of the structures are still preserved until today.

Quirino Bridge This scenic arch bridge traversing the Abra River is located between two beautiful mountains and is built to honor then-President Elpidio Quirino. It was once partly destroyed by Super Typhoon Feria, hence a different-looking third quarter portion.  In December 2007, Chinese engineers and a local construction company started to build a new, 456 meter-long replacement, a stone's throw from the original bridge. It was officially opened by then-President Gloria Macapagal Arroyo on December 30, 2009.  The old bridge, an iconic symbol of Ilocos Sur, is currently preserved as a tourist attraction, doubling as a backup in case the main bridge is damaged by typhoons.

Natural 
Carballo Mountains The municipality is home to a portion of this mountain range that overlooks the Cagayan Valley and portions of Babuyan Islands, and to which the municipality partly owes its name.  The range has two popular mountain peaks, Caniao and Tupira. This is one of the few mountain ranges in Ilocos Sur and the only natural tourist spot of Bantay aside from the Abra River.  It has forests and crystal-clear springs, which also supplies drinking water to most of Metro Vigan.  It is a destination of the Philippine Army and habitat of unique species like wild pigs and monkeys. Today it is a location of firing ranges, some telecommunications relay facilities (often mistaken by locals as a radar array), and hiking trails.  It also houses the headquarters and nursery for a reforestation project conducted by the Department of Environment and Natural Resources.

Education

Colleges
There are two major educational institutions in Bantay:

St. Paul College of Ilocos Sur (formerly Rosary College) - The oldest privately funded school in Ilocos Sur, founded as an all-girls' educational institution by the Sisters of Saint Paul of Chartres in Vigan.  Its former campus near the Vigan Cathedral is now the site of a shopping mall, having recently fully transferred to nearby Bantay.  It has recently joined the Saint Paul University System.
Ilocos Sur Community College (ISCC) - A college being operated by the provincial government, with its campus located near Quirino Stadium.  The college was founded in 1975.

High schools
Bantay National High School
Tay-ac National High School

References

External links

Pasyalang Ilocos Sur

Municipalities of Ilocos Sur
Populated places on the Abra River